Should a Wife Forgive? is a 1915 American silent drama film directed by Henry King and starring Lillian Lorraine, Mabel Van Buren, and Lew Cody.

Cast
 Lillian Lorraine as La Belle Rose 
 Mabel Van Buren as Mary Holmes 
 Henry King as Jack Holmes 
 Lew Cody as Alfred Bedford 
 William Lampe as Dr. Charles Hoffman 
 Mollie McConnell as Mrs. Forrester 
 Fred Whitman as Reggy Stratford 
 Daniel Gilfether as Henry Wilson 
 Marie Osborne as Robert Holmes, baby

References

Bibliography
 Donald W. McCaffrey & Christopher P. Jacobs. Guide to the Silent Years of American Cinema. Greenwood Publishing, 1999.

External links

1915 films
1915 drama films
Silent American drama films
Films directed by Henry King
American silent feature films
1910s English-language films
American black-and-white films
World Film Company films
1910s American films